Francesco Cigalini (1489 – 1551) was an Italian humanist, physician and astrologer.

Life 
Born in Como, son of the physician Paolo Cigalini, Francesco followed the studies of the father, but also was interested in other fields such as history, ancient languages, philosophy, theology, and had a real passion for astrology, becoming a major personality in Como. He was also an excellent connoisseur of Greek and Hebrew. He wrote a number of books, most lost, especially on astrology and antiquities. He died in the hometown in 1551.

His main treatise on astrology, Coelum sydereum, was published posthumously in Como in 1699, a century after it was written. This work in seven books is a large discussion of the influence and effectiveness of the constellations. According to Cigalini, "the operations of the stars are according to nature, not according to mathematics."

Works

See also 
 Gerolamo Cardano

References 

Italian astrologers
16th-century astrologers
Italian Renaissance humanists
16th-century Italian physicians
1551 deaths
1489 births
People from Como